The Himalayas or Himalaya are a mountain range in Asia.

Himalaya may also refer to:

People
 Andy Himalaya (born 1959), Mexican Alpine skier

Entertainment
 Himalaya (book), a 2004 travel book
 Himalaya (film), a 1999 Nepalese film
 Himalaya: Ladder to Paradise, a 2015 Chinese documentary film
 Himalayas (band), Welsh rock group
 The Himalayas (film), a 2015 film
 Himalaya with Michael Palin, a 2004 BBC television series
 Himalaya (ride), an amusement ride
"Himalaya", a 1972 song by C. Jérôme
"Himalaya", a 2003 song by Jeanette from Break On Through
"Himalaya", a 2020 song by New Found Glory from Forever + Ever x Infinity
"Himalayas", a 2015 song by Chief Keef from Sorry 4 the Weight

Ships
 , a P&O liner that became a Royal Navy troopship
 , a P&O liner that was a Royal Navy armed merchant cruiser and seaplane tender in World War I
 , a P&O liner

Other uses
 Himalaya Kingdom, a mythological mountainous country
 Himalaya clause, a contractual provision expressed to be for the benefit of a third party who is not a party to the contract
 Himalaya Studios, a computer game developer
 The Himalaya Drug Company, an ayurvedic drug company

See also
 Himalayan (disambiguation)
 Himalia (disambiguation)